Rosignano Solvay is a frazione (detached borough) of Rosignano Marittimo, Tuscany, Italy, located some 25 km from Livorno.

It houses the White Beaches (Italian: Spiagge bianche), whose sand is formed by limestone (calcium carbonate)(90%) and calcium sulfate (10%) due the soda ash production of the nearby Solvay since 1914.

Sights include the Teatro Solvay, two Etruscan museums and the Villaggio Solvay residential complex.

Waterfront 
The effluent from the Solvay factory contains limestone as well as other suspended solids such as gypsum, sand and clay. 
These materials are responsible for the particular color of the "White Beaches".
The European Environment Agency qualify the state of bathing waters as "excellent".
According to a report published in 1999 by the United Nations Environment Programme, the Spiagge Bianche has been among the 15 most polluted coastal sites on the Mediterranean Sea. Hotspots are evaluated based on the impact of the civil and industrial discharges regarding the quality of the local seawater, drinking water, recreational activities, the economy and social welfare.

In 2016 a study was conducted on the mortality rate compared to  the regional average for the same period; “Mortality for chronic-degenerative diseases in Tuscany: ecological study comparing neighboring areas with substantial differences in environmental pollution”. The study concludes shows an excess of mortality for chronic-degenerative diseases in the area but concludes that  it is not possible to establish a causal link between environmental pollution and an increase in mortality.

References

Cities and towns in Tuscany
Frazioni of the Province of Livorno